Sir William Watt Leggatt  (23 December 1894 – 27 November 1968) was an Australian soldier, lawyer and politician. He served as commanding officer of the 2/40th Battalion and later Sparrow Force during the Second World War, fighting in Timor against the Japanese invasion in 1942. He was captured by the Japanese and sent to Changi Prison in Singapore. Following the war, he was based in Melbourne in charge of war crimes investigation until 1946. In 1948 he was elected to the Victorian parliament. He died in 1968 and was accorded a state funeral.

See also
Battle of Timor

References
Leggatt, Sir William Watt (Bill) (1894 – 1968) - Australian Dictionary of Biography

External links

1894 births
1968 deaths
Australian colonels
Australian Knights Bachelor
Australian military personnel of World War I
Australian Army personnel of World War II
Australian prisoners of war
World War II prisoners of war held by Japan
Australian Companions of the Distinguished Service Order
Australian recipients of the Military Cross
Members of the Victorian Legislative Assembly
Liberal Party of Australia members of the Parliament of Victoria
Attorneys-General of Victoria
Australian barristers
Melbourne Law School alumni
People educated at Geelong College
Australian people of Scottish descent
Agents-General for Victoria